Zaviyeh-ye Jafarabad (also Romanized as Zāvīyeh-ye Ja‘farābād; also known as Zāvīyeh) is a village in Khvoresh Rostam-e Jonubi Rural District, Khvoresh Rostam District, Khalkhal County, Ardabil Province, Iran. At the 2006 census, its population was 210, in 45 families.

References 

Towns and villages in Khalkhal County